Himayat Ullah Mayar is a Pakistani politician who is currently serving as Mayor of Mardan since March 2022. He had also served as a member of the National Assembly of Pakistan from 2008 to 2013.

Political career
He served as former nazim of Mardan district.

He ran for the seat of the Khyber Pakhtunkhwa Assembly as a candidate of Awami National Party (ANP) from Constituency PK-25 (Mardan-III) in 2002 Pakistani general election but was unsuccessful. He received 5,483 votes and lost the seat to Israrul Haq, a candidate of Muttahida Majlis-e-Amal (MMA).

He was elected to the National Assembly of Pakistan from Constituency NA-9 (Mardan-I) as a candidate of ANP in by-polls held in 2012. He received 30,770 votes and defeated Maulana Shuja Ul Mulk, a candidate of Jamiat Ulema-e Islam (F) (JUI-F).

In August 2015, he was elected district nazim of Mardan.

References

Awami National Party politicians
People from Mardan District
Living people
Pakistani MNAs 2008–2013
Year of birth missing (living people)